Der fließende Fels is a German television series.

See also

List of German television series

External links
 

1989 German television series debuts